Museum of Civilization may refer to:

Canadian Museum of Civilization, the former name of the Canadian Museum of History, a museum in Hull, Gatineau, Quebec
Musée de la civilisation, a museum in Quebec City